René Ferté (1903–1958) was a Swiss actor who worked principally in the French cinema, from 1923 onwards. He is mostly known for performances in a series of silent films directed by Jean Epstein. His roles in sound films were generally less notable, though he appeared in Fritz Lang's Le Testament du docteur Mabuse (French version), and he took the title role in the 1934 sound remake of Judex. After the outbreak of the Second World War he ceased working in films.

Selected filmography
 1923 : L'Auberge rouge, directed by Jean Epstein
 1926 : Mauprat, directed by Jean Epstein
 1927 : La Glace à trois faces (The Three-Sided Mirror), directed by Jean Epstein
 1927 : Six et demi onze, directed by Jean Epstein
 1929 : Sa tête, directed by Jean Epstein
 1930 : Nos maîtres les domestiques (Our Masters, the Servants), directed by Hewitt Claypoole Grantham-Hayes
 1931 : Le Train des suicidés (The Train of Suicides), directed by Edmond T. Gréville
 1933 : Le Testament du docteur Mabuse, directed by Fritz Lang and René Sti (French language version)
 1934 : Judex 34, directed by Maurice Champreux
 1938 : Le Tigre du Bengale (Der Tiger von Eschnapur), directed by Richard Eichberg  (French language version)
 1938 : Le Tombeau hindou (Das indische Grabmal), directed by Richard Eichberg (French language version)
 1939 : Vidocq, directed by Jacques Daroy
 1943 : Untel père et fils (The Heart of a Nation), directed by Julien Duvivier (filmed 1939-40)

References

External links

1903 births
1958 deaths
Swiss male film actors
Swiss male silent film actors
People from La Chaux-de-Fonds